Grațian Petru Moldovan (born 29 September 1962) is a Romanian former football midfielder. After he ended his playing career, Moldovan settled in the United States.

Honours
Dinamo București
Divizia A: 1983–84
Cupa României: 1983–84

Notes

References

1962 births
Living people
Romanian footballers
Association football midfielders
Liga I players
Liga II players
FC Dinamo București players
CS Corvinul Hunedoara players